Aechmea colombiana is a plant species in the genus Aechmea. This species is native to Colombia and Ecuador.

References

colombiana
Flora of Ecuador
Flora of Colombia
Plants described in 1942